Bjarne Goldbæk (born 6 October 1968) is a Danish former professional footballer and current sports pundit for Eurosport. An attacking midfielder, he played for a number of foreign clubs, including Chelsea and Fulham in England and several clubs in Germany. He most prominently won the 1990 German Cup tournament and 1990–91 Bundesliga championship with 1. FC Kaiserslautern. For the Denmark national team, Goldbæk was capped 28 times, and he was a part of the Danish squads for the 1998 FIFA World Cup and UEFA Euro 2000 tournaments.

He works as a football agent, and as an occasional football commentator on Eurosport during Bundesliga matches.

Club career
Born in Copenhagen, Goldbæk started his career with Danish club B 1901, before he was snapped up by the top-flight Danish 1st Division club Næstved IF in 1987. He quickly moved abroad to play for Schalke 04 of the Bundesliga in September that year. In December 1989, Goldbæk changed clubs to Bundesliga rivals 1. FC Kaiserslautern, where he won the German Bundesliga championship in the 1990–91 season. He further played for Tennis Borussia Berlin and 1. FC Köln in Germany, before returning to Denmark to play for F.C. Copenhagen in 1996.

At F.C. Copenhagen, he quickly became a mainstay in the team, and he was awarded the 1998 F.C. Copenhagen Player of the Year award. Following good displays and a goal scored in two UEFA Cup Winners' Cup matches against Chelsea, he joined them in November 1998 for a fee of £330,000, in a deal that sent fellow Dane Brian Laudrup from Chelsea to Copenhagen. Goldbæk originally made a big impression when he moved to Stamford Bridge, but was not in favour with Chelsea's manager Gianluca Vialli, who tried to off-load him to Birmingham City and Nottingham Forest. He struggled to hold down a regular rotation place at Chelsea, before Fulham snatched him from Chelsea in January 2000, at the cost of £650,000. He made his Fulham debut in January 2000, a 1–0 home defeat at the hands of Grimsby Town. However, he soon became an important player, as Fulham won the English First Division crown in the 2000–01 season. As Fulham manager Jean Tigana's team strengthened, it appeared Goldbæk's future was becoming bleak at the club. He made just 17 appearances in the 2001–02 season. However, he started the next campaign in the picture, as he came on as a substitute in the Intertoto Cup game against FC Haka from Finland in early July 2002. As a result, Goldbæk would sign a one-year contract extension.

He left Fulham to play for Regionalliga club Rot-Weiss Essen in 2003. Goldbæk justified his move by stating that he had moved with his family into a house located in the nearby town of Gladbeck, and the support Rot-Weiss Essen commanded by regularly having 10.000 spectators at their home games . He was the team captain when the club earned promotion to the 2. Bundesliga in 2004, but as Rot-Weiss Essen were relegated to the Regionalliga again the following year, Goldbæk retired his active career in summer 2005.

International career
Goldbæk made his debut for the Denmark national team on 18 November 1987, in a 1988 Olympic Games qualifier against the West Germany Olympic national team, which ended in a 1–0 defeat.

After retirement
Goldbæk works as a licensed consultant for players and coaches.

Career statistics

Club

International

Honours
1. FC Kaiserslautern
 DFB-Pokal: 1990
 Bundesliga: 1990–91
 DFB-Supercup: 1991

F.C. Copenhagen
 Danish Cup: 1996–97

Chelsea
 FA Cup: 2000

Fulham
 Football League First Division: 2000–01

Individual
 Copenhagen Player of the Year: 1998

References

External links
 
 
 Bjarne Goldbæk  at NipserStat (F.C. Copenhagen career stats) 
 

1968 births
Living people
Footballers from Copenhagen
Association football midfielders
Danish men's footballers
Denmark international footballers
Denmark under-21 international footballers
Danish expatriate men's footballers
Expatriate footballers in Germany
F.C. Copenhagen players
FC Schalke 04 players
1. FC Kaiserslautern players
Tennis Borussia Berlin players
1. FC Köln players
Chelsea F.C. players
Fulham F.C. players
Rot-Weiss Essen players
1998 FIFA World Cup players
UEFA Euro 2000 players
Premier League players
Bundesliga players
2. Bundesliga players
Danish Superliga players